The Dawson 26 is an American trailerable sailboat that was designed by Robert Finch as a cruiser and first built in 1973.

Originally known as the Midship 26, the Dawson 26 design was later developed into the Parker Dawson 26, a boat with a lighter displacement and ballast.

Production
The design was built by the Dawson Yacht Corporation in the United States, with 300 examples completed between 1973 and 1982, but it is now out of production.

A brochure, created in 1976, described it as, "a center cockpit, trailerable, auxiliary yacht, engineered and built without compromise for extended ocean going capability. Two separate cabins, five full size berths, sloop or ketch rigged." The "D" for Dawson became a trademark on 8 February 1977 and was used in company advertisements. It was cancelled on 5 July 1983.

Design
The Dawson 26 is a recreational keelboat, built predominantly of fiberglass, with wood trim. It has a masthead sloop rig or optional ketch rig, with a mizzenmast. It features a raked stem, a plumb transom, a transom-hung rudder controlled by a wheel and a retractable centerboard. It displaces  and carries  of ballast.

The design has an unusual configuration for a boat of this size, with a center cockpit and an aft cabin.

The boat is optionally fitted with a Universal Atomic 4 gasoline engine for docking and maneuvering. The fuel tank holds .

Operational history
In the Story of the Windship 'Prodigal, Bob Lengyel wrote about a journey across the Atlantic Ocean on the Dawson 26 Prodigal. Lengyel sailed in June 1975, from Virginia Beach, Virginia, stopped at the Azores, arriving in Plymouth, England, on September 16, 1975, having sailed  in 42 days at sea. This was a "warm up" for the 1976 OSTAR, which Lengyel completed in his Dawson 26, during the summer of 1976.

See also
List of sailing boat typesRelated developmentParker Dawson 26Similar sailboats'
Beneteau First 26
Beneteau First 265
C&C 26
C&C 26 Wave
Contessa 26
Discovery 7.9
Grampian 26
Herreshoff H-26
Hunter 26
Hunter 26.5
Hunter 260
Hunter 270
MacGregor 26
Mirage 26
Nash 26
Nonsuch 26
Outlaw 26
Paceship PY 26
Pearson 26
Sandstream 26
Tanzer 26
Yamaha 26

References

Keelboats
1970s sailboat type designs
Sailing yachts
Trailer sailers
Sailboat type designs by Robert Finch
Sailboat types built by Dawson Yacht Corporation